Nawab Akbar Shahbaz Khan Bugti (Balochi,; 12 July 1927 – 26 August 2006) was a Pakistani politician and the Tumandar (head) of the Bugti tribe of Baloch people who served as the Minister of State for Interior and Governor of Balochistan Province in Pakistan. He also became minister of state for defence in the cabinet of Feroz Khan Noon. Earlier, he had also served as the Minister of State for Interior.

He was involved in a struggle, at times armed, for greater autonomy for Balochistan. The government of Pakistan accused him of keeping a private militia and leading a guerrilla war against the state. On 26 August 2006 Bugti was killed when his hide-out cave, located in Kohlu, about 150 miles east of Quetta, collapsed.

Early life and family

Nawab Akbar Shahbaz Khan Bugti was born on 12 July 1927 in Barkhan (in present-day Balochistan), the rural home of the Khetran, a Baloch tribe, to which his mother belonged. He was the son of the chief of his tribe, Nawab Mehrab Khan Bugti, and grandson of Sir Shahbaz Khan Bugti. He received his early education from Karachi Grammar School and later from Aitchison College after his father's death, later on he attended Oxford University.
Being the son of the tribe's chief, he became the tumandar (chief) of his tribe after his father. Nawab Akbar Bugti had three wives and thirteen children (6 sons and 7 daughters) altogether.

From his first wife: Nawab Saleem Bugti, Talal, Rehan and Salal Bugti. None of them are alive today. Nawabzada Salal Bugti was murdered in a shootout in Quetta by the rival Bugti Kalpar sub clan in June 1996. From Nawab Akbar Bugti's second wife: Jamil Bugti. And from Nawab Akbar Bugti's third wife: Shahzwar Bugti. Jamil Bugti and Shahzwar Bugti are the surviving sons of Nawab Akbar Bugti.
Akbar Bugti had five daughters from his first wife: Durr-e-Shahwar (deceased), Nilofer, Nazli (deceased), Durdana and Dreen. And two from his second wife: Shahnaz Marri (wife of Nawab Khair Bux Marri's relative, Humayun Marri) and Farah Naz Bugti (wife of Bivragh Bugti, the son of Nawabzada Ahmad Nawaz Bugti who was the brother of Nawab Akbar Bugti), who are the sisters of Jamil Bugti.

The Bugti grandchildren consist of Nawab Mohammad Mir Aali Bugti (the current Nawab of Bugti Tribe), Shaheed Nawabzada Mohammad Mir Zong Bugti, Shaheed Nawabzada Mohammad Mir Taleh Bugti, Nawabzada Mohammad Mir Zamran Bugti Chairman of P.J.W.P and Nawabzada Mohammad Mir Kohmir Bugti Vice Chairman of P.J.W.P (sons of Late Nawab Saleem Akbar Khan Bugti), Mir Brahamdagh (son of Rehan Bugti), Mir Shahzain President of J.W.P, Mir Gohram and Mir Chakar (sons of Talal Bugti).

Insurgency in Balochistan

Increase in tensions in 2005
In 2005, Bugti presented a 15-point agenda to the Pakistan government. Their stated demands included greater control of the province's resources and a moratorium on the construction of military bases. It also included a near 50% share of all the money used in the development of the province. In the meantime, attacks against the Pakistan Army also increased in the area, including a 2005 attack on a helicopter, in which the head of Pakistan's Frontier Corps and his deputy were injured.

In March 2006, a crowded bus carrying a wedding party hit an anti-tank mine in Dera Bugti. The blast resulted in the death of 28 people, mostly women and children, and injured 7 others. Most of the victims belonged to Masoori Bugti tribe which had revolted against Akbar Bugti's rule. Akbar Bugti claimed responsibility for the attack on the bus. Abdul Samad Lasi, a district chief, said that militants under the command of Akbar Bugti had planted hundreds of mines on dirt roads in various parts of Dera Bugti. The aim of planting such mines was to target the security forces in the area. Furthermore, he added that the Pakistani security forces had neutralized many of these landmines planted in the area.

Death
On 26 August 2006, Akbar Bugti was killed after the collapse of the cave in which he was hiding.

Inter-Services Public Relations (ISPR) Director General, during a press conference, gave details regarding the death of Akbar Bugti. The Director General said that the soldiers were rushed to the nine-foot-wide mouth of the L-shape cave after one of the two guides hired to help locate Nawab Akbar Bugti in the Kohlu area had signaled that 'he was inside' the cave. The guides belonged to Bugti tribe. The Director General stated that the soldiers had gone into the cave "to negotiate with Akbar Bugti". The soldiers were ordered to apprehend Akbar Bugti, and not harm or kill him. Once the soldiers had entered the cave, a "blast of undetermined origin" took place. The blast brought down the cave, killing all occupants in the process. The Director General said that no fighting or use of explosives preceded the "mysterious" blast which resulted in its collapse. Moreover, Director General also said that around 100 million Rupees and $96,000 cash, two satellite phones, documents, eight AK-47 rifles and some rockets were found in the rubble of the cave.

Similarly, some analysts also believe that no official orders were given to kill Akbar Bugti. As Akbar Bugti was politically isolated because of the decision of Bugti tribesmen during a Jirga in Dera Bugti. The Jirga of Bugti tribesmen had declared an end to the Sardari (feudal) system and proclaimed that Akbar Bugti was no longer their leader. Hence, it was not logical to launch a direct military operation to kill the ailing old Akbar Bugti.

However, according to some news reports, the cave collapsed because of the crossfire between the soldiers and the militants. As a result, 21 soldiers and 60 militants along with Akbar Bugti were killed.

Later on, Pakistan military took media teams to the cave where Akbar Bugti was killed. Pakistan army engineers cleared the rubble of the cave to retrieve the bodies of Akbar Bugti and others who were killed inside the cave. On 31 August 2006, the body of Akbar Bugti was found crushed under a boulder. He was identified through the glasses and Rolex wristwatch which was used by Akbar Bugti. His glasses, walking stick and Rolex wristwatch was presented to the journalists.

Brahamdagh Bugti's claims
The Chairman of the Baloch Youth Council (London), Waja Mir Hazar Khan Baloch, said that Balach Marri was behind the murder of Akbar Bugti. Hazar Khan said that he heard this accusation from Brahamdagh Bugti and that Brahamdagh Bugti told him that the cave in which Akbar Bugti was hiding in, came down due to blast by remote control and Balach Marri was standing just outside the cave at that time. Balach Marri was the head of Baloch Liberation Army (BLA) at that time.

Aftermath
On 1 September 2006 Bugti was buried in Dera Bugti, with his coffin sealed, next to the graves of his son and brother. His family, who wanted a public funeral in Quetta, did not attend the burial.
Some of family members of Akber Bugti and people from Bugti tribe think that the dead-body buried in Dera Bugti was not that of Akber Bugti.

On 26 September 2010 Abdul Qayyum Khan Jatoi, a senior Pakistan federal minister, criticized and accused the army of killing Baloch leader Nawab Akbar Bugti as well as the Pakistani politician, Benazir Bhutto. He later resigned when his political party summoned him and asked him to explain his comments.

Investigation and prosecution
On 11 July 2012, a Pakistani anti-terrorism court in Sibi, Balochistan, issued arrest warrants for the former military ruler, Pervez Musharraf and several other high-ranking officials who were accused of involvement in the killing of Akbar Bugti. The other officials included the former Prime Minister Shaukat Aziz, former Interior Minister Aftab Ahmad Sherpao, former Governor of Balochistan Owais Ahmed Ghani, former Chief Minister of Balochistan Jam Mohammad Yousaf, former Provincial Home Minister Shoaib Nosherwani, and former Deputy Commissioner Abdul Samad Lasi. All these were named suspects in the F.I.R. registered by police regarding the killing of Bugti in the military operation. Musharraf was formally arrested by a police team from Balochistan on 13 June 2013, however was later granted bail due to his poor health and ultimately due to non-provision of evidence.

See also
 Bugti
 Talal Akbar Bugti
 Abdul Nawaz Bugti

References

Notes
 Dawn – Dera Bugti jirga ‘ends Sardari system’
 Dawn – Elders term ‘jirga’ a govt drama
  DAWN – The Tumandar of the Bugtis
 Daily Times – Akbar Bugti killed in army operation
 Dawn – Bugti killed in operation: Six officers among 21 security personnel dead
 Gulf News – Bugti's killing will haunt Musharraf

Further reading
 Matheson, Sylvia A. The Tigers of Balochistan. London: Arthure Barker Limited (1967). Reprint: Oxford University Press, Karachi (1998), .

External links
 Interview by Qurat ul ain Siddiqui

|-

 

1927 births
2006 deaths
Baloch politicians
Baloch nationalists
Nawabs of Balochistan, Pakistan
Aitchison College alumni
Pakistani warlords
Governors of Balochistan, Pakistan
Chief Ministers of Balochistan, Pakistan
Leaders of the Opposition in the Provincial Assembly of Balochistan
People of the insurgency in Balochistan
Pakistani republicans
People from Barkhan District
People from Dera Bugti District
Pakistan Movement activists from Balochistan
Balochistan MPAs 1988–1990
Akbar
Princely rulers of Pakistan
Nawabs of Pakistan